Yevhen Fedorovych Stankovych (born September 19, 1942) is a contemporary Ukrainian composer of stage, orchestral, chamber, and choral works.

Biography 
Stankovych was born in Szolyva (today the Ukrainian city of Svaliava), in Hungary.

In 1962, Stankovych studied composition with the Polish composer  at the L'viv Mykola Lysenko Conservatoire. From 1965 to 1970, he studied composition with the Ukrainian composers Borys Lyatoshynsky and Myroslav Skoryk at the Kyiv Conservatory. Since 1988 he has worked as a music editor, and has since 1998 been the professor of composition at the Kyiv Conservatory, now the National Music Academy of Ukraine. From 20042010 he shared the chair of the National Union of Composers of Ukraine with Skoryk.

In 2012 Stankovych became the patron of Stankovych Music Instrumental competition. In 2017, he chaired the organizing committee of the All-Ukrainian Open Music Olympiad "The Voice of The Country".

Works 
Stankovych's works include 12 symphonies, five ballets, one opera, instrumental concertos, film scores, and chamber music. He composed a ballet based on the life of Princess Olga. His folk-opera "When the Fern Blooms" was the first modern work its type; it was written in 1970s but was forbidden to be performed by the Soviet authorities. The premiere took place in 2011.

Awards 
Awards and honours received by Stankovych for his compositions include:
 Hero of Ukraine (2008)
 Shevchenko National Prize (1977)
 Order of Friendship of Peoples (USSR)
 Medal "For Labour Valour" (USSR)

References

Sources

External links
 
 Yevhen Stankovych from the Living Composers Project
 Ukrainian Musicians Directory

1942 births
Living people
People from Svaliava
Ukrainian classical composers
Soviet classical composers
Eleventh convocation members of the Verkhovna Rada of the Ukrainian Soviet Socialist Republic
Members of the Congress of People's Deputies of the Soviet Union
Recipients of the title of People's Artists of Ukraine
Recipients of the title of Hero of Ukraine
Recipients of the Order of Friendship of Peoples
Recipients of the Order of Prince Yaroslav the Wise, 5th class
Recipients of the Shevchenko National Prize
Recipients of the Order of Prince Yaroslav the Wise, 4th class
Recipients of the Honorary Diploma of the Cabinet of Ministers of Ukraine